The 2012 Estoril Open was a tennis tournament played on outdoor clay courts. It was the 23rd edition of the Estoril Open for the men (the 16th for the women), and was part of the ATP World Tour 250 series of the 2012 ATP World Tour, and of the International-level tournaments of the 2012 WTA Tour. Both the men's and the women's events took place at the Estádio Nacional in Oeiras, Portugal, from 28 April through 6 May 2012.

ATP singles main draw entrants

Seeds

 Seedings are based on the rankings of April 23, 2012

Other entrants
The following players received wildcards into the main draw:
  Gastão Elias
  João Sousa
  Pedro Sousa

The following players received entry as a special exempt into the main draw:
  Attila Balázs

The following players received entry from the qualifying draw:
  Iñigo Cervantes 
  Javier Martí
  Daniel Muñoz de la Nava
  Iván Navarro

Withdrawals
  Carlos Berlocq
  Juan Ignacio Chela
  Gaël Monfils

Retirements
  Denis Istomin

ATP doubles main draw entrants

Seeds

 Rankings are as of April 23, 2012

Other entrants
The following pairs received wildcards into the doubles main draw:
  Gastão Elias /  João Sousa
  Frederico Gil /  Pedro Sousa

WTA singles main draw entrants

Seeds

 Seedings are based on the rankings of April 23, 2012

Other entrants
The following players received wildcards into the main draw:
  Nina Bratchikova
  Maria João Koehler
  Bárbara Luz

The following players received entry from the qualifying draw:
  Kristina Barrois
  Karin Knapp
  María Teresa Torró Flor
  Heather Watson

The following player received entry as lucky loser:
  Sloane Stephens

Withdrawals
  Mona Barthel (left foot injury)

Retirements
  Jarmila Gajdošová (left ankle injury)
  Polona Hercog (right foot injury)

WTA doubles main draw entrants

Seeds

1 Rankings are as of April 23, 2012

Other entrants
The following pairs received wildcards into the doubles main draw:
  Ekaterina Ivanova /  Maria João Koehler
  Margarida Moura /  Joana Valle Costa
The following pairs received entry as alternates:
  Estrella Cabeza Candela /  Bárbara Luz

Withdrawals
  Maria Kirilenko (right ankle injury)

Retirements
  Jarmila Gajdošová (left ankle injury)

Finals

Men's singles

 Juan Martín del Potro defeated  Richard Gasquet, 6–4, 6–2
It was del Potro's 2nd title of the year and 11th of his career. It was his 2nd win at Estoril, defending his title.

Women's singles

 Kaia Kanepi defeated  Carla Suárez Navarro, 3–6, 7–6(8–6), 6–4
It was Kanepi's 2nd title of the year and 3rd of her career.

Men's doubles

 Aisam-ul-Haq Qureshi /  Jean-Julien Rojer defeated  Julian Knowle /  David Marrero, 7–5, 7–5

Women's doubles

 Chuang Chia-jung /  Zhang Shuai defeated  Yaroslava Shvedova /  Galina Voskoboeva, 4–6, 6–1, [11–9]

External links
 Official website

Portugal Open
Estoril Open
Estoril Open
Estoril Open
April 2012 sports events in Europe
May 2012 sports events in Europe
 Estoril Open